Brogyntyn Castle is a ruin of a native Welsh castle found close to Selattyn, Shropshire, England, on the Anglo-Welsh border.  It is thought the castle was built, or at least owned, by Owain Brogyntyn, a 12th Century prince of the kingdom of Powys. Very little of the castle now remains.

The antiquarian resource book Earthwork of England, prehistoric, Roman, Saxon, Danish, Norman and medieval (1908) states:
"Brogyntyn Castle, near Oswestry, is a perfectly round moated site, the external diameter 290 feet, the internal 160 feet, and the fosse having a width of 65 feet."

Castle Brogyntyn formerly belonged to Owain Brogyntyn, the natural son of Prince Madog ab Meredydd.

Notes

References
The History of the Princes, the Lords Marcher, and the Ancient Nobility of Powys Fadog, and the Ancient Lords of Arwystli, Cedewen, and Meirionydd and Many of the Descendants of the Fifteen Noble Tribes of Gwynedd, 1887, London, by Jacob Youde William Lloyd
The Royal Tribes of Wales, 1799, London, Philip Yorke
Castell Brogyntyn Secret Shropshire

Ruins in Shropshire
History of Shropshire
Medieval Wales